Agrionympha kroonella is a species of moth belonging to the family Micropterigidae. It was described by George W. Gibbs and Niels P. Kristensen in 2011. It is found in South Africa, where it is known only from the Drakensberg Ranges in the Mpumalanga Province.

The habitat consists of moist ferns and low shrubs between taller forest and higher altitude low fynbos-type vegetation.

The length of the forewings is 3.1–3.3 mm for males and females.

Etymology
The species is named in honour of Dr. Doug Kroon who helped uncover the diversity of micropterigids in South Africa.

References

Endemic moths of South Africa
Micropterigidae
Moths described in 2011
Moths of Africa